Sub-counties are the decentralised units through which county governments of Kenya will provide functions and services. Except for the parts which fall under urban areas, sub-counties will coincide with the constituencies created under article 89 of the Constitution of Kenya. Sub-counties will be headed by a sub-county administrator, appointed by a County Public Service Board.

Under the former Constitution of Kenya, the Provinces of Kenya were subdivided into a number of districts (wilaya). In line with restructuring the national administration to fit with the devolved government system brought in by the 2010 Constitution, that came into full effect following elections in March 2013, the 8 provinces and their administrators and districts were replaced by County Commissioners at the county level, while former districts existing as of 2013 were re-organised as sub-counties, and had Deputy Commissioners appointed over them.

List of the 46 districts plus the capital of Kenya (since 1992, but prior to 2003) 
Following a High Court ruling in September 2009, there were 46 legal districts in Kenya, excluding Nairobi which constituted a 47th district.

Following the Kenyan general election, 2013, these districts and Nairobi now constitute the 47 counties which will be the basis for rolling out devolution as set out in the 2010 Constitution of Kenya (district headquarters are in parenthesis):

Coast Province:
 Kilifi District (Kilifi)
 Kwale District (Kwale)
 Lamu District (Lamu)
 Mombasa District (Mombasa)
 Taita-Taveta District (Wundanyi)
 Tana River District (Hola)
North Eastern Province:
 Garissa District (Garissa)
 Mandera District (Mandera)
 Wajir District (Wajir)
Eastern Province:
 Embu District (Embu)
 Isiolo District (Isiolo)
 Kitui District (Kitui)
 Machakos District (Machakos)
 Makueni District (Makueni)
 Marsabit District (Marsabit)
 Meru District (Meru)
 Mutomo District (Mutomo)
 Tharaka-Nithi District (Chuka)
Central Province:
 Kiambu District (Kiambu)
 Kirinyaga District (Kerugoya/Kutus)
 Murang'a District (Murang'a)
 Nyandarua District (Nyahururu)
 Nyeri District (Nyeri)
Rift Valley Province:
 Baringo District (Kabarnet)
 Bomet District (Bomet)
Elgeyo-Marakwet District
 Kajiado District (Kajiado)
 Kericho District (Kericho)
 Laikipia District (Nanyuki)
 Nakuru District (Nakuru)
 Nandi District (Kapsabet)
 Narok District (Narok)
 Samburu District (Maralal)
 Trans Nzoia District (Kitale)
 Turkana District (Lodwar)
 Uasin Gishu District (Eldoret)
 West Pokot District (Kapenguria)
Western Province:
 Bungoma District (Bungoma)
 Busia (Busia)
 Kakamega District (Kakamega)
 Vihiga District (Vihiga)
Nyanza Province:
 Homa Bay District (Homa Bay)
 Kisii Central (Kisii)
 Kisumu District (Kisumu)
 Migori District (Migori)
 Nyamira District (Nyamira)
 Siaya District (Siaya)

All these 46 districts (plus Nairobi) have been replaced with 47 counties since March 2013, promoting them as the first level of administrative subdivisions of the country, and the 8 former provinces (which were the first level of subdivisions) have been dissolved.

New districts started to be created by President Moi, and there were up to 57 districts in 2003 when President Kibaki first came into office.

List of the 70 districts of Kenya (starting 2007) 
In early January 2007, 37 new districts were created by the government from the 14 former districts, rising their number to 70.

 Baringo District (Kabarnet)
 Bomet District (Bomet)
 Bondo District (Bondo)
 Bungoma District (Bungoma)
 Buret District (Litein)
 Busia (Busia)
 Butere/Mumias District (Butere)
 Embu District (Embu)
 Garissa District (Garissa)
 Gucha District (Ogembo)
 Homa Bay District (Homa Bay)
 Ijara District (Ijara)
 Isiolo District (Isiolo)
 Kajiado District (Kajiado)
 Kakamega District (Kakamega)
 Keiyo District (Iten/Tambach)
 Kericho District (Kericho)
 Kiambu District (Kiambu)
 Kilifi District (Kilifi)
 Kirinyaga District (Kerugoya/Kutus)
 Kisii Central (Kisii)
 Kisumu District (Kisumu)
 Kitui District (Kitui)
 Koibatek District (Eldama Ravine)
 Kuria District (Kehancha)
 Kwale District (Kwale)
 Laikipia District (Nanyuki)
 Lamu District (Lamu)
 Lugari District (Lugari)
 Machakos District (Machakos)
 Makueni District (Makueni)
 Malindi District (Malindi)
 Mandera District (Mandera)
 Maragua District (Maragua)
 Marakwet District (Kapsowar)
 Marsabit District (Marsabit)
 Mbeere District (Mbeere)
 Meru Central District (Meru)
 Meru North District (Maua)
 Meru South District (Chuka)
 Migori District (Migori)
 Mombasa District (Mombasa)
 Mount Elgon District (Mount Elgon)
 Moyale District (Moyale)
 Murang'a District (Murang'a)
 Mwingi District (Mwingi)
 Nairobi District (Nairobi)
 Nakuru District (Nakuru)
 Nandi (Kapsabet)
 Narok District (Narok)
 Nyamira District (Nyamira)
 Nyandarua District (Ol Kalou)
 Nyando District (Awasi)
 Nyeri District (Nyeri)
 Rachuonyo District (Oyugis)
 Samburu District (Maralal)
 Siaya District (Siaya)
 Suba District (Mbita)
 Taita-Taveta District (Wundanyi)
 Tana River District (Tana River)
 Teso District (Malaba)
 Tharaka District (Tharaka)
 Thika District (Thika)
 Trans Mara District (Kilgoris)
 Trans Nzoia District (Kitale)
 Turkana District (Lodwar)
 Uasin Gishu District (Eldoret)
 Vihiga District (Vihiga)
 Wajir District (Wajir)
 West Pokot District (Kapenguria)
 Arabia ([[Mandera ])

More recent (defunct) districts (after 2007 up to March 2013) 
Many more districts have been created since then, such that in July 2009 there were 254 districts (an up to 256 districts plus Nairobi on 20 September 2009, when the High Court outlawed 210 of them).

The creation of new districts has been criticised by opponents for being waste of money and a populist attempt to please local residents. The government, however, say new districts bring services closer to the people and will provide security.

The following list contains 208 districts, taken from a Kenyan government website in July 2009 (the list is incomplete, but their number stopped growing after the High Court decision in September 2009):

Sub-counties (since March 2013) 
In August 2009, however, the High Court of Kenya declared all districts created after 1992 illegal. The judge stated that the districts were created "in complete disregard of the law". As a result, Kenya had only 46 legal districts (excluding Nairobi with its special constitutional status as the capital of the country). Following the March 2013 elections, these 46 districts – together with the City of Nairobi – constitute the 47 counties into which Kenya is now divided administratively, and they are also the 47 constituencies for the elections to the National Senate.

All the former districts have disappeared (as well as the former 8 provinces whose devolution was transferred to the new 47 counties), and are now considered only as "sub-counties", without autonomy; they are used in urban areas for a limited organisation for providing public services locally. These remaining sub-counties are transitional and could be replaced by more efficient cooperative structures grouping the local services in organised cities and their surrounding towns, either for dedicated missions or for temporary plans; so they may be deeply reorganised or disappear at any time. The remaining sub-counties already do not match with the subdivision of the new 47 counties into electoral-only "wards" (based on resident population, to determine the number of elected seats for each county in the National Senate.

Nairobi sub-counties

References 

 
Subdivisions of Kenya
Kenya, Districts
Kenya 1
Kenya geography-related lists